The 1968 Washington State Cougars football team was an American football team that represented Washington State University in the Pacific-8 Conference (Pac-8) during the 1968 NCAA University Division football season. In their first season under head coach Jim Sweeney, the Cougars compiled a 3–6–1 record (1–3–1 in Pac-8, seventh), and outscored their opponents 189 to 188.  The final two games were shutout victories.

The team's statistical leaders included Jerry Henderson with 1,586 passing yards, Richard Lee Smith with 326 rushing yards, and Johnny Davis with 421 receiving yards.

The Cougars won a second straight Apple Cup from rival Washington, shutting out the Huskies 24–0 in Spokane. This was the last time that this rivalry game was played on natural grass.  WSU played only five conference games, missing California and USC. Of the Cougars' five home games, three were played in Spokane. 

Sweeney was hired in early January; he was previously the head coach for five seasons at Montana State in Bozeman. 
He retained alumnus Laurie Niemi on the staff, but Niemi lost his twelve-year battle with cancer at age 42 in February.

Schedule

Roster

NFL/AFL draft
One Cougar was selected in the 1969 NFL/AFL draft.

References

External links
 Game program: Idaho vs. WSU at Spokane – September 21, 1968
 Game program: Utah at WSU – October 5, 1968
 Game program: Stanford vs. WSU at Spokane – October 19. 1968
 Game program: Oregon State at WSU – October 26, 1968
 Game program: Washington vs. WSU at Spokane – November 23, 1968

Washington State
Washington State Cougars football seasons
Washington State Cougars football